IRINN may mean:

 Islamic Republic of Iran News Network
 Indian Registry for Internet Names and Numbers